The Austin Film Critics Association Award for Best Adapted Screenplay is an annual award given by the Austin Film Critics Association, honoring the best in adapted screenplay.

Winners
 † = Winner of the Academy Award

2000s

2010s

2020s

See also
Austin Film Critics Association Award for Best Original Screenplay

References

Austin Film Critics Association Awards
Screenwriting awards for film